Karanlık Canyon, literally "Dark Canyon", is a deep steep-sided gorge located between the İliç and Kemaliye districts of Erzincan Province, Turkey, formed by Karasu River on the Munzur Mountains.

The Munzur Mountains, which run in about east-west direction, are split by north-south directed narrow valleys formed by streams. The formation in Kemaliye area, created by Karasu River, is called Kemaliye Pass. Its part between the Bağıştaş village of İliç and the Dutluca village of Kemaliye is named Karanlık Canyon.

The canyon offers outdoor recreational activities such as rock climbing and boat rides.

References

Canyons and gorges of Turkey
Landforms of Erzincan Province
Tourist attractions in Erzincan Province
Kemaliye